Chambersburg Mall is a regional shopping mall located near Chambersburg, Pennsylvania in the unincorporated community of Scotland.  Located at exit 20 off Interstate 81, the mall has 1 store but a capacity of at least 64.  It is currently owned and managed by Namdar Realty Group. The mall's anchor stores are Black Rose Antiques & Collectibles and AMC Theatres. There are 3 vacant anchor stores that were once JCPenney, Burlington, and The Bon-Ton.

History
Chambersburg Mall opened in 1982 under Crown American mall developers with Hess's and Gee Bee as anchors, plus a Carmike Cinemas.  The Bon-Ton was added three years later in 1985.  Sears joined the mall in 1991 when it moved from downtown Chambersburg.  In the early 1990s, Hess's closed all of its stores and the mall's store was replaced with JCPenney, which moved from a plaza in downtown Chambersburg.  Gee Bee became Value City in 1992 but closed in 2008.  The store was replaced with Burlington.

Crown American's mall portfolio was acquired by Pennsylvania Real Estate Investment Trust (PREIT) in 2003.  In 2009, U.S. News & World Report named the mall one of the 10 most endangered in the United States, calling it a "sleepy mall a perennial underperformer". As of 2009, the mall had an occupancy rate of 62 percent and sales of $234 per square foot.  In May 2012, the mall was put up for sale again. An October 2013 report by the Chambersburg Public Opinion confirmed that an unknown party had put a non-refundable deposit on the mall. In November 2013, the mall was officially sold to Mason Asset Management for $8.8 million. PREIT expected the net proceeds from the sale to be $8.4 million.

Sears closed at the mall in late 2014 and the space is now occupied by Black Rose Antiques & Collectibles, an antique mall which also operates in Hanover, Pennsylvania and Allentown, Pennsylvania.  JCPenney closed in mid July 2015 and in late August 2018, The Bon-Ton closed as a result of the entire chain filing for bankruptcy.  Both the JCPenney and Bon-Ton spaces remain vacant.  On January 18, 2019, Burlington closed at the mall leaving Black Rose Antiques & Collectables as the only anchor left.

Chambersburg Mall had as many as 75 stores at its peak in the 1990s and early 2000s. Throughout the 2000s, the number of stores and services dwindled down to approximately 30 including anchor store Black Rose Antiques & Collectibles and an AMC Classic movie theater due to competition from newer shopping centers in the area as well as other factors including online shopping. As of 2023, there is only 1 store left in operation an art gallery which is open occasionally on weekends.

See also
 List of shopping malls in Pennsylvania

References

External links
 Chambersburg Mall official website

Shopping malls in Pennsylvania
Shopping malls established in 1982
Tourist attractions in Franklin County, Pennsylvania
Namdar Realty Group